Vänskä is a Finnish surname.

Geographical distribution
As of 2014, 93.7% of all known bearers of the surname Vänskä were residents of Finland and 5.6% of Sweden.

In Finland, the frequency of the surname was higher than national average in the following regions:
 1. North Karelia (1:378)
 2. Kymenlaakso (1:2,670)
 3. Päijänne Tavastia (1:3,249)
 4. Southern Savonia (1:3,406)
 5. Uusimaa (1:3,774)

People
Olli Vänskä, Finnish violinist
Osmo Vänskä (born 1953), Finnish classical clarinetist, composer and conductor
Sami Vänskä (born 1976), Finnish heavy metal bass guitarist
Satu Vänskä (born 1979), Finnish classical violinist

References

Finnish-language surnames